Richard Walter is an American author, educator, screenwriter, commentator, consultant, and chairman of the University of California, Los Angeles graduate program in screenwriting.

He has written several  works, including the Essentials of Screenwriting, published in June 2010, and the novels Escape from Film School and Barry and the Persuasions. Other publications include screenwriting books The Whole Picture: Strategies for Screenwriting Success in the New Hollywood and Screenwriting: The Art, Craft and Business of Film and Television Writing.

His sister was actress Jessica Walter.

He is married to Patricia Sandgrund, with whom he has two children.

Career
Walter lectures on screenwriting and storytelling throughout North America and the world. He has written numerous feature assignments for the major studios and has sold material to all of the Big Three television networks. He has also written many informational, educational and corporate films, and is a 30-year member of the Writers Guild of America. He has conducted master classes in London, Paris, Jerusalem, Madrid, Rio de Janeiro, Mexico City, Beijing and Hong Kong.

Walter is also a pop culture critic and media pundit on entertainment history-related topics, such as anti-Americanism and Hollywood, screenwriting as a career, film production and politics. Walter is also a court authorized expert in intellectual property law, in particular plagiarism and copyright infringement.

Students
Students from Walter’s screenwriting program at UCLA have written projects for Steven Spielberg, and many successful Hollywood  productions, including three Academy Awards for best screenplay: Dustin Lance Black for Milk and Alexander Payne for Sideways and The Descendants. Other past students of the UCLA program under Walter's direction include these television and film screenwriters:
 Sacha Gervasi – The Terminal
 Dan Mazeau – Wrath of the Titans
 Felicia Henderson – Fringe, Gossip Girl, Soul Food (television series), Everybody Hates Chris, Fresh Prince of Bel-Air, Single Ladies
 Caroline Williams – The Office, Modern Family
 Don Payne – The Simpsons, Fantastic Four: Rise of the Silver Surfer, Thor (2011) and its sequel Thor: The Dark World
 Paul Castro – August Rush
 Tom Shadyac – I Now Pronounce You Chuck & Larry, Bruce Almighty, Dragonfly, Nutty Professor II: The Klumps, Ace Ventura: Pet Detective, Liar Liar
 David Koepp – Jurassic Park, Spider-Man, Carlito’s Way, War of the Worlds, Angels & Demons
 Gregory Widen – Highlander, Backdraft
 Scott Rosenberg – Beautiful Girls, Things to Do in Denver When You’re Dead, High Fidelity
 Scott Kosar – Amityville Horror, Texas Chainsaw Massacre, The Crazies, The Machinist
 Audrey Wells – The Game Plan, Shall We Dance?, Under the Tuscan Sun, The Kid, George of the Jungle, The Truth About Cats & Dogs

References

External links
 Richard Walter's Official Website
 
 UCLA School of Theater, Film and Television
 Writers Guild of America

UCLA School of Theater, Film and Television faculty
20th-century American dramatists and playwrights
Jewish American writers
Place of birth missing (living people)
Year of birth missing (living people)
American male screenwriters
Screenwriting instructors
Living people
20th-century American male writers
Screenwriters from California
20th-century American screenwriters
American people of Polish-Jewish descent
21st-century American Jews